Club Deportivo Atlético San Lorenzo  is a Salvadoran professional football club based in San Lorenzo, San Vicente,  El Salvador.

The club currently plays in the Tercera Division de Fútbol Salvadoreño.

List of coaches

  Edgardo Flores (2018) 
  Alonzo Aguilar (July 2021-Present)

References

Football clubs in El Salvador